The 2020–21 Western Football League season (known as the 2020–21 Toolstation Western Football League for sponsorship reasons) was the 119th in the history of the Western Football League, a football competition in England. Teams were divided into two divisions; the Premier and the First. 

The constitution was announced on 21 July 2020.

After the abandonment of the previous season due to the COVID-19 pandemic, the league's constitution remained unchanged, with the planned structural changes being put back to this season.

This season, the Premier Division champions were to be promoted to Step 4. The runners-up in this division and ten other Step 5 divisions in other leagues would be ranked according to PPG (points per game), and the top four in that ranking would also be promoted. The remaining seven runners-up were to compete in "winner takes all" play-offs with seven clubs finishing bottom in Step 4 leagues, the winners being placed at Step 4 and the losers at Step 5 for 2021–22.

The bottom clubs in all 14 Step 5 divisions were to be ranked according to PPG, with the 12 lowest-ranked clubs relegated to Step 6.

In Division One, the top four clubs were to be promoted to Step 5, with the bottom two liable to relegation to Step 7.

Suspension and curtailment
Fixtures were temporarily suspended on 30 December 2020, again due to the COVID-19 pandemic, but were suspended until further notice on 14 January 2021. The FA curtailed the season on 24 February, with no further league fixtures to be played.

Premier Division
The Premier Division remained unchanged, with 21 clubs.

League table at time of curtailment

Stadia and locations

First Division
The First Division also remained unchanged, with 20 clubs.

League table at time of curtailment

Stadia and locations

References
 League tables

External links
 Western League Official Site

2020–21
9
Western Football League, 2020-21